Flückiger is a habitational  surname for someone from a place near Bern in Switzerland called Flückingen. Notable people with the surname include:

Friedrich August Flückiger (1828–1894), Swiss pharmacist, chemist and botanist
Hans Flückiger (born 1926), Swiss cyclist
Marcel Flückiger (1929–2010), Swiss footballer
Mathias Flückiger (born 1988), Swiss mountain bike racer
Lukas Flückiger (born 1984), Swiss mountain bike racer
Pierre-André Flückiger (born 1919), Swiss sports shooter
Sylvia Flückiger-Bäni (born 1952), Swiss politician

References

Toponymic surnames
Swiss-German surnames